Arnaldo Luís Isaías Abrantes (born 7 November 1986) is a Portuguese track and field sprinter, specialising in the distances of 100 metres and 200 metres. He also competes in the 4×100 metres relay. His father, Arnaldo Abrantes, was also a sprinter.

Abrantes currently acts as Head of Performance at Premier League football side Nottingham Forest.

Career
Born in Cova da Piedade, Abrantes began running at the Núcleo Desportivo Juvenil do Laranjeiro in 2002 where he remained until 2003. He joined Sporting Clube de Portugal in 2004, but left in 2010 (competing only for the Portuguese team).

At the 2007 Summer Universiade he managed a sixth place in the final 100 m, with a time of 10.53 seconds. He participated in the 2007 European Athletics U23 Championships in Debrecen and was a semi-finalist in both the 100 and 200 m, before going on to claim a silver medal in the relay with colleagues Dany Gonçalves, Ricardo Martins and Yazaldes Nascimento. At the Osaka 2007 World Athletics Championships, Abrantes reached the quarter-finals of the 200 m.  As well as achieving the entry standard time for the Olympic Games 2008 he also beat his personal best and national under-23 record of 20.48 seconds.

He qualified to compete at the 2008 Summer Olympics, but was eliminated in the opening rounds. The following year he improved his 100 m personal best to 10.19 seconds (the third best time by a Portuguese sprinter ever). He achieved a second-place finish at the European Team Championships in the 200 metres, behind only to Dwain Chambers. At the Portuguese Championships he was runner-up to Francis Obikwelu with a wind-assisted run of 10.13 seconds. He was not in shape to compete in the 200 m at the 2009 World Championships in Athletics, but he did run in the national relay team.

2010
He managed to reach the entry standard for the European Championships in Barcelona, the time being slightly above his personal best. He participated in the 200 metres reaching the semi-finals. In the 4x100 metre relay, along with fellow Ricardo Monteiro, Francis Obikwelu and João Ferreira, he beat the national record to 38.88 seconds. It was the first time a Portuguese team completed the relay race in under 39 seconds.

2011
Having left Sporting Clube de Portugal, he began the 2010/2011 season as an individual athlete. Despite competing as individual, he surprised everyone at the National Indoor Championships by winning the 60 m race, beating fellow countryman Francis Obikwelu.  Abrantes set a new personal best of 6.65 seconds. 
 
At the 2011 European Athletics Indoor Championships in Paris, he qualified for the semi-finals with a time of 6.65 (matching his personal best), but did not make the final. He started the outdoor season on 15 May at the University National Championships, opening the season with a time 10.56 seconds. A week later, at the Meeting of Leiria, he won with a time of 10.54 seconds. In early June, he participated in the International Flanders Athletics Meeting in Belgium. In the 100 metres he lined up against the then world champion in the 60 metres Dwain Chambers, taking second place with 10.70 seconds.  Chambers finished the race in 10.27 seconds – a heavy headwind of -2.3 m/s affected the race. Later in the same meeting, Abrantes won the 200 metres in 20.90 seconds.

On 3 July, Arnaldo Abrantes participated in the Meeting of Chaux de Fonds in the 200 metres finishing second with 20.61 seconds (wind: +0.8 m / s). This result achieved the entry standard for the 2011 World Championships in Athletics in Daegu and 2012 Olympic Games in London.

Personal bests

All information taken from IAAF profile, except 300 metres record.

Competition performances
National Championships
 1st place Outdoor National Championship 2007 100 m - 10.33
 1st place Outdoor National Championship 2004 200 m - 21.63
 1st place Indoor National Championship 2009 60 m - 6.72
 1st place Indoor National Championship 2011 60 m - 6.65
Olympic Games
 Beijing 2008, 200 m (Heats - 21.46)
World Championships
 Berlin 2009, 100 m (Heats - 10.41 / Quarter Final - 10.40)
 Osaka 2007, 200 m (Heats - 20.48 / Quarter Final - 20.82)
European Championships
 Barcelona 2010, 200 m (Heats - 20.87 / Quarter Final - 20.88)
 Barcelona 2010, 4 × 100 m (Heats - 39.30 / Final (6th) - 38.88)
European Indoor Championships
 Turin 2009, 60 m (Heats - 6.78)
 Paris 2011, 60 m (Heats - 6.65 / Semi-Final - 6.66)
World Junior Championships
 Grosseto 2004, 100 m (Heats - 10.93)
Lusophony Games
 Macau 2006, 200 m (Final (2nd) - 21.92)
 Lisbon 2009, 200 m (Final (1st) - 20.64)
Universiade
Bangkok 2007, 100 m 7th place

References

1986 births
Living people
Sportspeople from Almada
Portuguese male sprinters
Olympic athletes of Portugal
Athletes (track and field) at the 2008 Summer Olympics
Athletes (track and field) at the 2012 Summer Olympics
World Athletics Championships athletes for Portugal
S.L. Benfica athletes
Nottingham Forest F.C. non-playing staff